The Liverpool Garston by-election of 5 December 1957 was held after the resignation of Conservative Party MP Sir Victor Raikes.

The seat was safe for the Conservatives, having been won at the 1955 United Kingdom general election by nearly 12,000 votes.

Result of the previous general election

Result of the by-election

References

1957 elections in the United Kingdom
1957 in England
1950s in Liverpool
December 1957 events in the United Kingdom
Garston, 1957